Aeolidiella drusilla is a species of sea slug, an aeolid nudibranch in the family Aeolidiidae.

Description
The body attains a length of 60 mm.

Distribution 
This marine species was described from Cook Strait, New Zealand. It is also found in southern Australia.

References 

 Burn R. (2006) A checklist and bibliography of the Opisthobranchia (Mollusca: Gastropoda) of Victoria and the Bass Strait area, south-eastern Australia. Museum Victoria Science Reports 10:1–42

Aeolidiidae
Gastropods described in 1900